Irmgard Furchner ( Dirksen; 29 May 1925) is a German former concentration camp secretary and stenographer at the Stutthof concentration camp, where she worked for camp commandant Paul-Werner Hoppe.  In 2021, at the age of 96, she was charged with 11,412 counts of accessory to murder and 18 additional counts of accessory to attempted murder, and in December 2022, she was found guilty and sentenced to a suspended jail term of two years.

Trial
Furchner's trial was held in a juvenile court in Itzehoe, as Furchner was only 18 years old at the time of the alleged offenses. She had worked at the camp between June 1943 and April 1945. She had announced in advance that she did not wish to appear in court and asked the judge not to expect her to do so; indicating in a letter that she would boycott her trial as "degrading". In a criminal trial, however, the presence of the accused is essential.

At the end of September 2021, a few hours before the start of her trial, she left the Quickborn retirement home where she resided and took a cab to the Norderstedt Mitte subway station. The president of the criminal chamber subsequently issued a warrant for her arrest; Furchner was quickly captured and arrested. Five days later, she was released from pretrial detention under conditions. The trial was postponed until 19 October 2021. Towards the end of the trial, Furchner stated "I'm sorry for everything that happened. I regret that I was in Stutthof at the time. I can't say anything else."

On 20 December 2022, Furchner was found guilty of complicity in the murders of more than 10,500 people and sentenced to a two-year suspended jail term.

Personal life
Following the end of World War II, Furchner married Heinz Furchtsam (a former SS squad leader who died in 1972). She was later employed as an administrative worker in northern Germany.

References

1925 births
Living people
Place of birth missing (living people)
Stutthof concentration camp personnel
Holocaust trials
People convicted of murder by Germany
Secretaries
Stenographers
20th-century German women
21st-century German women
21st-century German criminals